Jawahar Navodaya Vidyalaya, Gadag is a CBSE affiliated school in Gadag District of Karnataka under the Hyderabad region of Navodaya Vidyalaya Samiti (NVS). JNV Gadag is located near village Korlahalli of Mundargi taluka. This school is a residence school and all facilities to the students is free of cost.

References

External links 

Schools in Gadag district
Jawahar Navodaya Vidyalayas in Karnataka
Educational institutions established in 1999
1999 establishments in Karnataka